In topology, an Alexandrov topology is a topology in which the intersection of any family of open sets is open. It is an axiom of topology that the intersection of any finite family of open sets is open; in Alexandrov topologies the finite restriction is dropped.

A set together with an Alexandrov topology is known as an Alexandrov-discrete space or finitely generated space.

Alexandrov topologies are uniquely determined by their specialization preorders. Indeed, given any preorder ≤ on a set X, there is a unique Alexandrov topology on X for which the specialization preorder is ≤. The open sets are just the upper sets with respect to ≤. Thus, Alexandrov topologies on X are in one-to-one correspondence with preorders on X.

Alexandrov-discrete spaces are also called finitely generated spaces since their topology is uniquely determined by the family of all finite subspaces. Alexandrov-discrete spaces can thus be viewed as a generalization of finite topological spaces.

Due to the fact that inverse images commute with arbitrary unions and intersections, the property of being an Alexandrov-discrete space is preserved under quotients.

Alexandrov-discrete spaces are named after the Russian topologist Pavel Alexandrov. They should not be confused with the more geometrical Alexandrov spaces introduced by the Russian mathematician Aleksandr Danilovich Aleksandrov.

Characterizations of Alexandrov topologies 

Alexandrov topologies have numerous characterizations. Let X = <X, T> be a topological space. Then the following are equivalent:
 
Open and closed set characterizations:
 Open set. An arbitrary intersection of open sets in X is open.
 Closed set. An arbitrary union of closed sets in X is closed.
Neighbourhood characterizations:
 Smallest neighbourhood. Every point of X has a smallest neighbourhood.
 Neighbourhood filter. The neighbourhood filter of every point in X is closed under arbitrary intersections.
Interior and closure algebraic characterizations:
 Interior operator. The interior operator of X distributes over arbitrary intersections of subsets.
 Closure operator. The closure operator of X distributes over arbitrary unions of subsets.
Preorder characterizations:
 Specialization preorder. T is the finest topology consistent with the specialization preorder of X i.e. the finest topology giving the preorder ≤ satisfying x ≤ y if and only if x is in the closure of {y} in X.
 Open up-set.  There is a preorder ≤ such that the open sets of X are precisely those that are upward closed i.e. if x is in the set and x ≤ y then y is in the set.  (This preorder will be precisely the specialization preorder.)
 Closed down-set.  There is a preorder ≤ such that the closed sets of X are precisely those that are downward closed i.e. if x is in the set and y ≤ x then y is in the set.  (This preorder will be precisely the specialization preorder.)
 Downward closure. A point x lies in the closure of a subset S of X if and only if there is a point y in S such that x ≤ y where ≤ is the specialization preorder i.e. x lies in the closure of {y}.
Finite generation and category theoretic characterizations:
 Finite closure. A point x lies within the closure of a subset S of X if and only if there is a finite subset F of S such that x lies in the closure of F. (This finite subset can always be chosen to be a singleton.)
 Finite subspace. T is coherent with the finite subspaces of X.
 Finite inclusion map. The inclusion maps fi : Xi → X of the finite subspaces of X form a final sink.
 Finite generation. X is finitely generated i.e. it is in the final hull of the finite spaces. (This means that there is a final sink fi : Xi → X where each Xi is a finite topological space.)

Topological spaces satisfying the above equivalent characterizations are called finitely generated spaces or Alexandrov-discrete spaces and their topology T is called an Alexandrov topology.

Equivalence with preordered sets

The Alexandrov topology on a preordered set 

Given a preordered set  we can define an Alexandrov topology  on X by choosing the open sets to be the upper sets:

We thus obtain a topological space .

The corresponding closed sets are the lower sets:

The specialization preorder on a topological space 

Given a topological space X = <X, T> the specialization preorder on X is defined by:

 x ≤ y if and only if x is in the closure of {y}.

We thus obtain a preordered set W(X) = <X, ≤>.

Equivalence between preorders and Alexandrov topologies 

For every preordered set X = <X, ≤> we always have W(T(X)) = X, i.e. the preorder of X is recovered from the topological space T(X) as the specialization preorder.
Moreover for every Alexandrov-discrete space X, we have T(W(X)) = X, i.e. the Alexandrov topology of X is recovered as the topology induced by the specialization preorder.

However for a topological space in general we do not have T(W(X)) = X. Rather T(W(X)) will be the set X with a finer topology than that of X (i.e. it will have more open sets).
The topology of T(W(X)) induces the same specialization preorder as the original topology of the space X and is in fact the finest topology on X with that property.

Equivalence between monotonicity and continuity 

Given a monotone function

f : X→Y

between two preordered sets (i.e. a function

f : X→Y

between the underlying sets such that x ≤ y in X implies f(x) ≤ f(y) in Y), let

T(f) : T(X)→T(Y)

be the same map as f considered as a map between the corresponding Alexandrov spaces. Then T(f) is a continuous map.

Conversely given a continuous map

g: X→Y

between two topological spaces, let

W(g) : W(X)→W(Y)

be the same map as f considered as a map between the corresponding preordered sets. Then W(g) is a monotone function.

Thus a map between two preordered sets is monotone if and only if it is a continuous map between the corresponding Alexandrov-discrete spaces. Conversely a map between two Alexandrov-discrete spaces is continuous if and only if it is a monotone function between the corresponding preordered sets.

Notice however that in the case of topologies other than the Alexandrov topology, we can have a map between two topological spaces that is not continuous but which is nevertheless still a monotone function between the corresponding preordered sets. (To see this consider a non-Alexandrov-discrete space X and consider the identity map i : X→T(W(X)).)

Category theoretic description of the equivalence

Let Set denote the category of sets and maps. Let Top denote the category of topological spaces and continuous maps; and let Pro denote the category of preordered sets and monotone functions. Then

T : Pro→Top and
W : Top→Pro

are concrete functors over Set that are left and right adjoints respectively.

Let Alx denote the full subcategory of Top consisting of the Alexandrov-discrete spaces. Then the restrictions

T : Pro→Alx and
W : Alx→Pro

are inverse concrete isomorphisms over Set.

Alx is in fact a bico-reflective subcategory of Top with bico-reflector T◦W : Top→Alx. This means that given a topological space X, the identity map

i : T(W(X))→X
is continuous and for every continuous map

f : Y→X

where Y is an Alexandrov-discrete space, the composition

i −1◦f : Y→T(W(X))

is continuous.

Relationship to the construction of modal algebras from modal frames 

Given a preordered set X, the interior operator and closure operator of T(X) are given by:

Int(S) = { x ∈ X : for all y ∈ X, x ≤ y implies y ∈ S }, and
Cl(S) = { x ∈ X : there exists a y ∈ S with x ≤ y }

for all S ⊆ X.

Considering the interior operator and closure operator to be modal operators on the power set Boolean algebra of X, this construction is a special case of the construction of a modal algebra from a modal frame i.e. from a set with a single binary relation. (The latter construction is itself a special case of a more general construction of a complex algebra from a relational structure i.e. a set with relations defined on it.) The class of modal algebras that we obtain in the case of a preordered set is the class of interior algebras—the algebraic abstractions of topological spaces.

Properties 

Any subspace of an Alexandrov-discrete space is Alexandrov-discrete.

The product of two Alexandrov-discrete spaces is Alexandrov-discrete.

Every Alexandrov topology is locally compact in the sense that every point has a local base of compact neighbourhoods, since the smallest neighbourhood of a point is always compact.

Every Alexandrov topology is locally path connected.

History 

Alexandrov spaces were first introduced in 1937 by P. S. Alexandrov under the name discrete spaces, where he provided the characterizations in terms of sets and neighbourhoods. The name discrete spaces later came to be used for topological spaces in which every subset is open and the original concept lay forgotten in the topological literature. On the other hand, Alexandrov spaces played a relevant role in Øystein Ore pioneering studies on closure systems and their relationships
with lattice theory and topology.

With the advancement of categorical topology in the 1980s, Alexandrov spaces were rediscovered when the concept of finite generation was applied to general topology and the name finitely generated spaces was adopted for them. Alexandrov spaces were also rediscovered around the same time in the context of topologies resulting from denotational semantics and domain theory in computer science.

In 1966 Michael C. McCord and A. K. Steiner each independently observed an equivalence between partially ordered sets and spaces that were precisely the T0 versions of the spaces that Alexandrov had introduced. P. T. Johnstone referred to such topologies as Alexandrov topologies. F. G. Arenas independently proposed this name for the general version of these topologies.  McCord also showed that these spaces are weak homotopy equivalent to the order complex of the corresponding partially ordered set.  Steiner demonstrated that the equivalence is a contravariant lattice isomorphism preserving arbitrary meets and joins as well as complementation.

It was also a well-known result in the field of modal logic that a equivalence exists between finite topological spaces and preorders on finite sets (the finite modal frames for the modal logic S4). A. Grzegorczyk observed that this extended to a equivalence between what he referred to as totally distributive spaces and preorders. C. Naturman observed that these spaces were the Alexandrov-discrete spaces and extended the result to a category-theoretic equivalence between the category of Alexandrov-discrete spaces and (open) continuous maps, and the category of preorders and (bounded) monotone maps, providing the preorder characterizations as well as the interior and closure algebraic characterizations.
 
A systematic investigation of these spaces from the point of view of general topology, which had been neglected since the original paper by Alexandrov was taken up by F. G. Arenas.

See also 
 P-space, a space satisfying the weaker condition that countable intersections of open sets are open

References

Closure operators
Order theory
Properties of topological spaces